Omar Ziad El Kurdi (born 19 October 1992) is a Lebanese footballer who plays as a winger or full-back for  club Sagesse.

Club career 
Coming through the youth system, El Kurdi began his senior career at Lebanese Premier League club Safa, playing 110 league games and scoring nine goals. He helped his side win two league titles, one FA Cup, one Elite Cup, and one Super Cup.

On 16 July 2020, El Kurdi joined Nejmeh for a fee of around £L175 million. He initially retired on 26 August 2021, aged 28, but returned to Nejmeh's squad the following month. In August 2022, El Kurdi joined Sagesse on a free transfer.

Style of play 
El Kurdi mainly plays as a winger, but can also play as a full-back or midfielder.

Honours 
Safa
 Lebanese Premier League: 2012–13, 2015–16
 Lebanese FA Cup: 2012–13
 Lebanese Elite Cup: 2012
 Lebanese Super Cup: 2013

Nejmeh
 Lebanese FA Cup: 2021–22; runner-up: 2020–21
 Lebanese Elite Cup: 2021
 Lebanese Super Cup runner-up: 2021

References

External links

 
 
 
 

1992 births
Living people
Footballers from Beirut
Lebanese footballers
Association football wingers
Association football fullbacks
Safa SC players
Nejmeh SC players
Sagesse SC footballers
Lebanese Premier League players
Lebanon youth international footballers
Lebanon international footballers